H. Monroe Browne (May 9, 1917 – June 13, 2006) was an American businessman who served as the United States Ambassador to New Zealand and Samoa from 1981 to 1985.

He died of a heart attack on June 13, 2006, in Wheatland, California, at age 89.

References

1917 births
2006 deaths
Ambassadors of the United States to New Zealand
Ambassadors of the United States to Samoa
California Republicans
20th-century American diplomats